John Fantham (6 February 1939 – 25 June 2014) was an English footballer.

Fantham was born in Sheffield, West Riding of Yorkshire. He is Sheffield Wednesday's leading post-war goalscorer with 166 goals. He was signed in 1956 and made his Wednesday debut two years later. Fantham firmly established himself as an able goalscorer in the English top flight for Wednesday, as his 23 goals helped the club to a second-place finish in 1960–61. The following season, he netted 24 times, earning him selection for the England under-23 team and his only England cap at full international level. He was an integral part of the Wednesday side that reached the 1966 FA Cup Final and two years later, he passed Redfern Froggatt's post war scoring record. Fantham made 435 appearances for the club, staying until 1969 when he joined Rotherham United.

References

External links
 
 England profile
 Sheffield stats

1939 births
2014 deaths
English footballers
England international footballers
England under-23 international footballers
Sheffield Wednesday F.C. players
Rotherham United F.C. players
Macclesfield Town F.C. players
Footballers from Sheffield
Association football inside forwards
English Football League players
English Football League representative players
FA Cup Final players